Philippe Jorion is an author, professor and risk manager. He is the author of more than 100 publications on the topic of risk management and international finance, and is credited with pioneering the Value at Risk approach to risk management.

Jorion's works include Financial Risk Manager Handbook and Value at Risk: The New Benchmark for Managing Financial Risk. He serves as the Chancellor’s Professor of Finance at the Paul Merage School of Business at the University of California at Irvine and is a managing director at investment firm PAAMCO where he heads the Risk Management group.
 
Jorion has received several awards honoring excellence in research and financial writing, including two from the CFA Institute. Jorion holds an MBA and a PhD from the University of Chicago and a degree in engineering from ULB Brussels.

References

Year of birth missing (living people)
Living people
International finance economists
University of Chicago Booth School of Business alumni
University of California, Irvine faculty
Financial writers